Walter Chetwynd (died 31 May 1638) was an English politician who sat in the House of Commons at various times between 1584 and 1614.

Life

Chetwynd was the son of John Chetwynd of Ingestre, near Stafford and his second wife Margery Middlemore, daughter of Robert Middlemore of Edgbaston, Warwickshire. He was educated at Barnard's Inn and at Gray's Inn in 1582. He succeeded his half-brother Sir William Chetwynd to the Ingestre estate in 1612.

In 1584, he  was elected Member of Parliament for Newcastle-under-Lyme. He was re-elected MP for Newcastle in 1586. From about 1592 he was J.P. for Shropshire and by 1596 he was JP for Staffordshire. He was  commissioner for musters for Staffordshire in 1601. In 1604 he was knighted and was elected MP for Newcastle-under-Lyme again. He was High Sheriff of Staffordshire for 1607–08. 

In 1613 he rebuilt Ingestre Hall. From 1613 to 1614 he was Mayor of Newcastle-under-Lyme. In 1614 he was elected MP for Staffordshire. 
 
Chetwynd married firstly Mary Mullins, daughter of John Mullins, Archdeacon of London and had two sons and a daughter. He married secondly Catherine Unton, widow of Edward Unton of Wadley, Berkshire and daughter of Sir George Hastings. He was succeeded by his eldest son, Walter.

References

Year of birth missing
1638 deaths
Members of the Parliament of England for Newcastle-under-Lyme
Members of Gray's Inn
Mayors of places in Staffordshire
English MPs 1584–1585
English MPs 1586–1587
English MPs 1604–1611
English MPs 1614
High Sheriffs of Staffordshire